Anne Rabbitte (born 11 October 1973) is an Irish Fianna Fáil politician who has served as a Minister of State since July 2020. She has been a Teachta Dála (TD) for the Galway East constituency since 2016.

She was a member of Galway County Council from 2014 for the Loughrea local electoral area until her election to the Dáil in 2016. In May 2016, she was appointed to the Fianna Fáil Front Bench, as Spokesperson for Children and Youth Affairs.

In April 2019, Rabbitte criticised plans to excavate the site of the former Bon Secours Mother and Baby Home in Tuam, describing it as "a wilful waste of public money", and questioned if the intention was to dig up every cillín (burial ground for stillborn and unbaptised infants) in Ireland.

In May 2019, Rabbitte contested the European Parliament election in Midlands–North-West but was unsuccessful.

Rabbitte was re-elected in Galway East at the general election in February 2020. Following the formation of a new government of Fianna Fáil, Fine Gael and the Green Party, Rabbitte was appointed as a Minister of State on 1 July 2020. She was appointed as Minister of State at the Department of Children, Equality, Disability, Integration and Youth and Minister of State at the Department of Health with responsibility as Minister of State for Disability.

References

External links

Anne Rabbitte's page on the Fianna Fáil website

1970 births
Living people
Alumni of the University of Galway
Fianna Fáil TDs
Local councillors in County Galway
Members of the 32nd Dáil
Members of the 33rd Dáil
21st-century women Teachtaí Dála
Ministers of State of the 33rd Dáil
Women ministers of state of the Republic of Ireland